The 2006 LPGA Tour was a series of weekly golf tournaments for elite female golfers from around the world, which took place from February through December 2006. The tournaments were sanctioned by the United States-based Ladies Professional Golf Association (LPGA). In 2006, prize money on the LPGA Tour exceeded US$50 million for the first time in the history of the LPGA Tour.

Lorena Ochoa became the first Mexican to top the money list on the LPGA Tour, or any major international golf tour, while Annika Sörenstam held her position as the top ranked player through the whole season. Multi-time major champions Karrie Webb and Se Ri Pak had comeback seasons after fallow periods, each claiming a major championship.

2006 saw a growth in the international presence on the Tour. Of the 33 events, only seven were won by Americans, with Cristie Kerr the only American to win more than once (three times). By contrast, Mexican Lorena Ochoa won six events, Australian Karrie Webb five, Swede Annika Sörenstam three, and nine different South Koreans combined to win 11 events. The season-ending LPGA Playoffs at The ADT was won by Paraguayan Julieta Granada. The other seven finalists in that event featured only two Americans (Paula Creamer and Natalie Gulbis); the others were Ochoa, Webb, Koreans Il Mi Chung and Mi Hyun Kim, and Japanese Ai Miyazato.

For details of what happened in the main tournaments of the year see 2006 in golf.

Tournament schedule and results
 The winner of Major events automatically qualified for the LPGA Playoffs at The ADT. ADT Playoffs points were doubled at Major events.
 The top-20 finishers in Points events earned double ADT Playoffs points.
 The champion of Winner events automatically qualified for LPGA Playoffs at The ADT. Other top-20 finishers earned single ADT Playoffs points.
 The Global Group (pre-determined international events) events were combined to count as one Winner event qualifier, with the player earning the most combined points in these events earning automatic entry to LPGA Playoffs at The ADT. No additional points were awarded.
 Unofficial money Events did not count toward entry into the LPGA Playoffs at The ADT.
 The first half of the season concluded with the final full-field domestic event (Jamie Farr Owens Corning Classic) prior to the Tour traveling to Europe.
 The second half concluded with final event (The Mitchell Company Tournament of Champions) prior to the LPGA Playoffs at The ADT.

The number in parentheses after winners' names show the player's total number of official money, individual event wins on the LPGA Tour including that event.

Tournaments in bold are majors.
* tournament shortened to 54 holes because of rain.

Leaders
Money List leaders

Full 2006 Official Money List

Scoring Average leaders

Full 2006 Scoring Average List - navigate to "2006", then "Scoring Average"

Award winners
The three competitive awards given out by the LPGA each year are:
The Rolex Player of the Year is awarded based on a formula in which points are awarded for top-10 finishes and are doubled at the LPGA's four major championships and at the season-ending ADT Championship. The points system is: 30 points for first; 12 points for second; nine points for third; seven points for fourth; six points for fifth; five points for sixth; four points for seventh; three points for eighth; two points for ninth and one point for 10th.
2006 Winner: Lorena Ochoa. Runner-up: Karrie Webb
The Vare Trophy, named for Glenna Collett-Vare, is given to the player with the lowest scoring average for the season.
2006 Winner: Lorena Ochoa. Runner-up: Annika Sörenstam
The Louise Suggs Rolex Rookie of the Year Award is awarded to the first-year player on the LPGA Tour who scores the highest in a points competition in which points are awarded at all full-field domestic events and doubled at the LPGA's four major championships. The points system is: 150 points for first; 80 points for second; 75 points for third; 70 points for fourth; and 65 points for fifth. After fifth place, points are awarded in increments of three, beginning at sixth place with 62 points. Rookies who make the cut in an event and finish below 41st each receive five points.  The award is named after Louise Suggs, one of the founders of the LPGA.
2006 Winner: Seon Hwa Lee. Runner-up: Julieta Granada

See also
2006 in golf
2006 Ladies European Tour
2006 Duramed Futures Tour

LPGA Tour seasons
LPGA Tour